Seeing Red is a 1992 Australian film directed by Virginia Rouse and starring Zoe Carides, Anne-Louise Lambert, Peta Toppano, and David Wenham.

Plot summary

Cast
 Tony Llewellyn-Jones as Duncan Banks
 Anne-Louise Lambert as Amanda
 Peta Toppano as Vivien
 Zoe Carides as Red Sessions
 Henri Szeps as Louie Leeds
 George Spartels as Mark
 Hugh Llewellyn-Jones as Hugh Banks
 David Wenham as Frank No 2
 David Field as William
 Anthony Brandon Wong as Nyguen (as Anthony Wong)
 Jean Heard as Clarice
 Peter Sumner as Gorman

References

External links
 
 

Australian television films
1992 films
1990s English-language films